Mark van Allen (born 1954) is an American musician, recording engineer and record producer, born in Worcester, Massachusetts, United States. Instruments he plays include the pedal steel guitar,  dobro, lap steel guitar, electric and acoustic guitar, bass guitar, and the mandolin.

As a touring and session musician, van Allen has appeared with a wide variety of artists, covering many musical genres, including Zac Brown Band, Shawn Mullins, Buddy Miles, Hank Thompson, Indigo Girls, John Berry, Mark Wills, Blueground Undergrass, Warren Haynes, Sugarland, Jimmy Herring, Leftover Salmon, Guy Clark, Vassar Clements, Rehab, Peter Rowan, Manchester Orchestra, and many more.

He currently resides in Atlanta, Georgia, where he runs a multitrack recording studio and is active on the local recording and national touring scene.

Discography

 Caroline Aiken- "Live at Tree Sound Studios"  (2004)- Pedal Steel
 Jon Allmet- "Nowhere Is Too Far"- Between The Sheets Music (2003)- Pedal Steel
 Brian Ashley-Jones Trio- "Courier"- (2007)- Dobro, Recording and Mixdown Engineer, Co- Producer
 Aslyn- T.B.A. - Pedal Steel
 Arlington Priest- "The Memory of Your Company"- Crazy Neighbor Records (2006)- Pedal Steel, Dobro
 Athma Mitram- "Heartland"- ATM 008- (2002)- Recording Engineer
 Alan Wayne Baker- "Everyday Thing"- Rogue (1994)- Pedal Steel
 Leslie Barnett- T.B.A.- Pedal Steel
 Steve Baskin- "Naked"- (2009)- Pedal Steel
 Nathan Beaver- "Universal You"- (2010)- Pedal Steel
 Nathan Beaver- "Everybody's Out Tonight"- (2011)- Pedal Steel
 Berkely Power Corporation- Power up Jingle- (2011)- Pedal Steel
 John Berry- "Things Are Not The Same"- LP- Clear Sky Records AR86101 (1986)- Pedal Steel
 John Berry- "Things Are Not The Same"- Liberty/Patriot CDP-7243-8-31387-2-2 (1994)- Pedal Steel
 Bishop Don- "That Should Heal Nicely" (2007)- Pedal Steel
 The Bird Dogs- "Why Not?" (2005)- Pedal Steel, Dobro, Harmony Vocals, Producer and Engineer
 Blueground Undergrass- "Barnyard Gone Wrong"-  Root Cellar RC5901 (1999)- Pedal Steel, Harmony Vocals, Recording and Mixdown Engineer, Co-Producer
 Blueground Undergrass- "Live at Southside Music Hall"- HaneyJones Music (1999)- Pedal Steel
 Blueground Undergrass- "Live At The Variety Playhouse"- Phoenix Presents 3001 (1999)- Pedal Steel, Lap Steel, Mixdown Engineer, Co-Producer
 Blueground Undergrass- "Live At The Variety Playhouse"- European Vinyl Release- Comet/Horizon HZ004/2 (1999)- Pedal Steel, Lap Steel, Mixdown Engineer, Co-Producer
 Blueground Undergrass- "Live at Iota"- DMATT4508 (1999)- Pedal Steel, Lap Steel
 Blueground Undergrass- "Live At The Variety Halloween"- SBD GINA PCM-M1 (1999)- Pedal Steel, Lap Steel
 Blueground Undergrass- "Newground"-  BGUG AS11BN8-01 (2000)- Pedal Steel, Dobro, Lap Steel, Lead and Harmony Vocals, Recording and Mixdown Engineer, Mastering Engineer, Producer
 Blueground Undergrass- "Phoenix Presents Sampler"- Phoenix 6002 (2000)- Pedal steel, Mixdown Engineer
 Blueground Undergrass- Play J.Com- "Windows" Sampler (2000)- Pedal Steel
 Border Collies- "The Road From Swannanoa"- BCO2-01 (2002)- Recording Engineer
 Box Rockers- "Dance Around It"- BR0001 (2003) Pedal Steel, Dobro, Lap Steel, Recording and Mixdown Engineer, Co-Producer
 Adam Bret- "I Really Want To Say"-  (2009) Pedal Steel
 Shane Bridges- "Moodswing Halo"- Riverbridge (2002)- Pedal Steel, Dobro, Recording and Mixdown Engineer, Producer
 Shane Bridges- "Broken Window Pains"- Riverbridge (2007)- Pedal Steel
 Joyce Brookshire- "Whatever Became Of Me?"- EmWorld Records EMW-1009 (2000)- Pedal Steel, Dobro
 Calliope Fair- "On Board The Armenia"-  Root Cellar (2002)-  Pedal Steel, Dobro, Recording and Mixdown Engineer
 Captain Soularcat- "Three Rivers Point" CS2699 (2004)- Pedal Steel
 Larry Scott Chapman- "Once In A Blue Moon"- Shane Records S4793 (2006)- Pedal Steel, Dobro
 Connor Christian and Southern Gothic- "90 Proof Lullabye"- (2008)- Pedal Steel, Lap Steel
 Connor Christian and Southern Gothic- "New Hometown"- (2010)- Pedal Steel
 Leslie Christian- "The Oprah Song"- (2011)- Pedal Steel
 Dwain Cleveland- "Gathering Of Eagles" (2007)- Electric and Acoustic Guitar, Classical Guitar, Pedal Steel, Bass, Recording and Mixdown Engineer, Producer
 Del Conner- "Knee Deep In Blues"- DellConn (2002) Pedal Steel
 Clay Cook- "Clay Cook"- Claycook.com (2005)- Pedal Steel
 Cornbread- "With Shawn Mullins"- (2003)- Pedal Steel
 Cowboy Envy- "Real Cowboy Girl"- NikiVicki (1997)- Pedal Steel
 Cowboy Envy- "Wagons Ho"- Daemon Records (2000)- Pedal Steel
 Dave Daniels- "Clementine"- Black Hills Music (2009)- Pedal Steel, Recording Engineer
 Dave Daniels & New Pony- "Songs From Stone Mountain"- (2006)- Pedal Steel, Recording and Mixdown Engineer, Co-Producer
 Dave Daniels & The PTA- "Just Like Ghosts"- (2009)- Pedal Steel, Recording Engineer, Production
 Dan K. Theory- "The Discussion Begins..."-  Root Cellar RC 5903 (2001)- Lap Steel, Dobro, Recording and Mixdown Engineer
 Nichole Davidson- "Just Being Me"- (2002)- Pedal Steel
 Kahle Davis and the Night Watchmen- TBA- (2007)- Pedal Steel, Dobro, Recording and Mixdown Engineer, Co-Producer
 Laveda Dorsey- "God Sent An Angel"- (2008)- Pedal Steel, Dobro
 Tim Dugger- "Highway to Fame"- Television Special- (2007)- Pedal Steel, Dobro
 Russ Duty- "Streetcars Ain't Got Handlebars"- (2006)- Pedal Steel
 Libby Eason- "She Dreams Alone"- Dark Rose DRM1015 (1996)- Pedal Steel, Dobro, Lead Guitar
 Libby Eason- "Imperfectly"- Dark Rose DRM2002 (2002)- Dobro
 Emmaus Road Project- "In The Beginning"- (2004) Pedal Steel
 Kyle Ensley- "Between 17 And 20" b/w " The Christmas Tree"- 45 RPM single (1988)- Pedal Steel
 Owen Evans- T.B.A. (2007) Pedal Steel, Dobro, Lap Steel
 Steve Freeman- CD Single-(2008) Pedal Steel
 Kecia Garland- TBA- (2007)- Pedal Steel, Dobro, Recording and Mixdown Engineer, Producer
 Georgia- "Lovin' You Still"- (2010)- Pedal Steel
 Georgia Fair- "Georgia Fair"- Sony Music- (2011)- Pedal Steel
 Good Medicine- "Prompt Temporary Relief"- Root Cellar RC-5902- (1999)- Pedal Steel
 Gov't Mule- "Mulennium"- Live at the Roxy- Atlanta, GA- Evil Teen 651751-12102-7- (2010)- Pedal Steel
 John Grant- "John Grant"- RCR Records RCR0001- (1996)- Pedal Steel, Dobro, Lead Guitar
 Happy Holidays From 99X- Volume III- (Sugarland) Best Buy.Com (2003)- Pedal Steel
 Josh Harris- "Josh Harris"- (2010)- Pedal Steel
 Bret Hartley Experiment- "Sideman Blues"- Tremolo Blue Music (2005)- Pedal Steel
 Rich Healy- "Just For The Songs"- Up And Running UARS001- (1999)- Pedal Steel, Dobro, Electric Guitar
 Hemlockfest 2011- Festival Compilation CD ("Revolution" with Saint Francis)- 2011- Pedal Steel
 Wayne Hill- "Not Too Late To Love Again"- Forte Music (2002)- Pedal Steel
 Donna Hopkins- "Free To Go"- DHB- 5299 (2003)- Dobro, Recording Engineer
 Simon Horrocks- Clear Channel Jingle- (2008) Pedal Steel
 James Matthew Hughes- "Old North Monroe" - (2011)- Pedal Steel
 Indigo Girls- "All That We Let In"- Sony/Epic EK 91003 (2004)- Pedal Steel, Dobro
 The Internationals- T.B.A. -(2011)- Pedal Steel, Dobro, Lap Steel, Recording  & Mixdown Engineer
 Jackson County Line- "Jackson County Line"- JCL001 (2007)- Pedal Steel
 Kate James and Lost Country- "Homewrecker, Heartbreaker"- Hayden's Ferry 24012 (2003)- Pedal Steel
 Victor Johnson - "Shine On the Waters of My Soul" - Beautiful Things (2015) - Pedal Steel
 Merlin Jones- "A Song About A Letter" b/w "I Love You"- 45 RPM single Frontier records (1979) Pedal Steel
 Danny Kahn- "Lost My Steel Railways"-  (2000)- Pedal Steel, Dobro,  Electric Guitar
 Kate and The Retreads- "HomeWrecker, HeartBreaker"- (2003)- Pedal Steel
 Steven Kern- "For The Lord Is Royalty"- Recording & Mixdown Engineer, Co-Producer, Pedal Steel
 Mike Killeen- "Guns Kill People"- (2006)- Pedal Steel, Dobro, Recording Engineer, Co-Producer
 Mike Killeen- "Demos, Outtakes, Live and Whatnot"- (2006)- Pedal Steel, Dobro, Recording, Mixing and Mastering Engineer, Co- Producer
 Mike Killeen- "Little. And Low."- 227 Springdale Records- (2008)-  Pedal Steel, Lap Steel, Recording and Mixdown Engineer
 Mike Killeen- "Poverty is Real"- (2010)- Pedal Steel
 Sheri Kling- "Let It Unfold"- Heartsprings Music HS 0201 (2002)- Pedal Steel, Dobro
 Sheri Kling- "Heartland"- Heartsprings Music HS 0501 (2005)- Pedal Steel, Dobro
 Rebecca Loebe- "Sugar On A Stick"- 2008- Pedal Steel
 Rebecca Loebe- "Mystery Prize" - 2009- Pedal Steel, Dobro
 Lollipop Rock- "Lollipop Rock"- LPR 3305 (2001)- Pedal Steel
 Richard Long- "Souldiers"- RLP 001 (1999)- Pedal Steel, Recording Engineer, Producer
 Manchester Orchestra- "Manchester Orchestra"- (2010)- Pedal Steel
 Kristin Markiton- "Wandering Moon"- (2006) Pedal Steel, Dobro
 Kristin Markiton- CD Single- (2008) Pedal Steel
 Kristin Markiton Band- "Live at Eddie's Attic Sept. 13, 2006" - (2006)- Dobro
 Kristin Markiton Band- "T.B.S. Soundstage"- DVD (2006)- Pedal Steel, Dobro
 Nathan Mayberry- "Man Made Trouble"- (2005)- Pedal Steel, Baritone Guitar, Recording Engineer
 Nathan Mayberry- "Live at Eddie's Attic" (2005)- Pedal Steel
 Nathan Mayberry- "Myth of the Self Made Man" (2006)- Pedal Steel, Dobro, Recording Engineer
 Selene McCarthy- "Horses And Guitars"- Mane N' Tale (1996)- Pedal Steel, Dobro, Electric Guitar
 Selene McCarthy - "Fresh Flowers" -  Mane N' Tale 002 (2000)- Pedal Steel, Dobro, Lead Guitar
 Christopher Mercure- "Simple Life"- RamCat 12342 (1995)- Pedal Steel
 Mike Mermin- "Long Journey"- Pedal Steel, Dobro
 Rich Millett- "This Guy's The Limit"- Pop Head Music FR/SS-001 (2002)- Pedal Steel
 Nate Montgomery- T.B.A. (2009)- Pedal Steel, Dobro, Lead Guitar, Recording Engineering
 Moonshine Still- "[R]Evolution"- TreeSound (2005)- Pedal Steel
 Joseph Patrick Moore- "Drum And Bass Society Volume 1"- Blue Canoe Records 613847010042 (2004)- Pedal Steel
 Queenie Mullinix- "One Horse Town"-  (2000)- Pedal Steel, Dobro, Electric Guitar, Recording Engineer
 Music Badger.Com- "Live"- MB004 (2001)- Pedal Steel
 Moira Nelligan- "Hell Broke Loose in Georgia"- (2007)- Recording and Mixdown Engineer, Bass, Pedal Steel
 New Frontiers- "Mending"- Militia 62 (2008)- Pedal Steel
 New Orlean's Juice-  "Hey Buddy"- DJR 0001 (2005)- Pedal Steel
 Krysta Nick- War and Sand- (2009)- Pedal Steel
 Dorothy Norwood- "It's Been Worth It All"- Malaco Records 4557 (2009)- Pedal Steel
 Oldstar- "Oldstar"- Riverbridge MR1304 (2000)- Pedal Steel
 Packway Handle Band- "Chaff Harvest"- Busboat (2003)-  Recording Engineer
 The Planet Riders- "Crush"- PRM0040- (2004)- Pedal Steel, Dobro, Electric Guitar, Baritone Guitar, Recording and Mixdown Engineer
 The Planet Riders- "Live At Eddie's Attic 3-24-04"  (2004) Pedal Steel, Dobro, Bad Jokes
 Phoenix Presents Sampler- (Blueground Undergrass)-  Phoenix 6002 (2000)- Pedal Steel, Mixdown Engineer
 PlayJ.Com- "Windows Sampler" (Blueground Undergrass) (2000) Pedal Steel
 Berne Poliakoff- "Language Of Dreams"-  CD-100 (2005)- Pedal Steel
 Ranger Bill- "For The Kids" (2005)- Pedal Steel, Dobro, Guitar, Bass, Keyboards, Baritone Guitar, Producer and Engineer
 Tyler Reeve- "Whiskey Down"- (2007)- Pedal Steel, Dobro, Lap Steel
 Rehab- "Welcome Home"- (2009)- Pedal Steel
 Revolution Radio- "Signature Jingle"- (2011)- Pedal Steel
 Randy Roddy- "Memories of You" b/w "Someone Cares"- 45 RPM single- Frontier Records (1980) Pedal Steel
 J.R. Rund- "She Says"- (2008)- Dobro
 Robin Dean Salmon- "America" (2007)- Pedal Steel, Dobro
 James Salter- "Slowly First"- (2007)- Pedal Steel
 St. Francis- "First Of Many"- (2011)- Pedal Steel, Mastering Engineer
 St. Francis- "Revolution Radio Signature"- (2011)- Pedal Steel
 Mark Scott- "County Line"- U.S. 78 Music (2004)- Pedal Steel
 Cory Sellers- "Cory Sellers"- (2006)- Pedal steel, Dobro
 Paul Sforza- "Lifelines"- Turnstone Records TR5170 (2002)- Pedal Steel
 Shadowood- "The Treehouse Incident"- Shady Music BODGPF02 (2002)- Pedal Steel
 Karen Shayne- "Dream"- Rogue (2000)- Pedal Steel
 Bill Shultz- 'Collage"- (2003)- Pedal steel, Dobro, Electric Guitar, Recording and Mixdown Engineer
 Corey Smith- "Hard Headed Fool"-  Razor & Tie 95611 (2007)- Pedal Steel, Dobro
 Corey Smith- "Keeping Up With The Joneses"-Undertone Records (2009)- Pedal Steel, Dobro
 Corey Smith- "The Broken Record"- Undertone Records (2010)- Pedal Steel
 Emily Smith, P.H.D.- "Create Your Day, Celebrate Your Night"- Spirit Wave Healing.com (2009)- Pedal Steel, Keyboards, Synthesizer, Music Production, Recording and Mixdown Engineer
 Jan Smith- "Rain"- Rogue- (1994)- Pedal Steel, Songwriter
 South 70- "Two Lane Road"- (2006)- Pedal Steel, Dobro
 South 70- "South 70"- DrumBum Music (2008)- Pedal Steel, Lap Steel
 Star Route USA- Compilation- Pedal Steel
 Sufficient Grace- "Sufficient Grace"- (2009)- Pedal Steel
 Sugarland- "Happy Holidays From 99X"- Volume III- BestBuy.com (2003)
 Sugarland- "Premium Quality Tunes"- SGLND 01 (2004)- Pedal Steel
 Sundiver- CD in progress- Pedal Steel
 Tanglewood Tonic- TBA (2007)- Recording and Mixdown Engineer
 Kurt Thomas- "Enjoy The Ride"- Rogue KT0002 (2002)-Pedal Steel
 Jim Thompson- "Cosmic Cabin Memories"- TD76301 (2001)- Pedal Steel, Acoustic and Electric Guitar, Dobro, Mandolin, Bass, Baritone Guitar, Recording and Mixdown Engineer, Producer
 Thornton Price- "Move Along"- TP10 (1997)- Pedal Steel
 Andy Velo- "Andy Velo"- (2011)- Pedal Steel
 Watch and Learn Let's Jam - "Country and Bluegrass"- Cassette and Video Learning Systems (2001)- Pedal Steel
 Wayside Riders- "Grey"- WR001- (2004)- Pedal Steel
 Jayron Weaver- "Jayron Weaver"- (2011)- Pedal Steel, Dobro
 Pete Whitfield- "Crazy"- (2006)- Pedal Steel, Dobro
 Whiskey Gentry - "Whiskey Gentry" (2010)-  Pedal Steel
 Andy Lee White- "Unhyphenated American" (2010)- Pedal Steel
 Wighat- TBA-(2007) Mixdown Engineer
 Dusk Wilson Weaver- "Dusk"- Phi Acoustics D 12751 (2001)- Pedal Steel, Dobro, Electric Guitar
 Elise Witt- "Open The Window"- EmWorld Records EMW-1008 (1997)- Pedal Steel
 Tom Wolf- "Crazy Heart"-TJW102 (2007)- Dobro and Bad Jokes
 Francisco Vidal Band- "Drive"-  Pedal Steel
 DeDe Vogt- "The Willing Suspension Of Disbelief"- Daemon (1993)- Pedal Steel
 Zac Brown Band-"Home Grown"- (2005)- Pedal Steel
 Zydeco T- "We Know What You Want"- (2007)- Recording and Mixdown Engineer, Co-Producer
 Kristen Englenz- "Demo"- (2012)- Recording Engineer, Mixdown Engineer, Producer, Pedal Steel

References

External links

1954 births
Living people
American male guitarists
American multi-instrumentalists
American audio engineers
American session musicians
Musicians from Worcester, Massachusetts
Musicians from Atlanta
Record producers from Georgia (U.S. state)
Record producers from Massachusetts